Supreme Knowledge Foundation Group of Institutions, formerly Sir J. C. Bose School of Engineering, is an engineering college situated at Mankundu in Hooghly, West Bengal, India.  The college is affiliated to the Maulana Abul Kalam Azad University of Technology (MAKAUT). It was established in 2009 by the Supreme Knowledge Foundation (SKF). The college is 34 kilometers from Kolkata city and 30 minutes journey from Kolkata International Airport.

Campus 
The college campus is adjacent to Mankundu rail station. The campus has access to National Highway-2. The 10.4 acres campus is embraced with greenery.

Infrastructure 
Most of the faculty members have notable research background along with Masters and Ph D. The institute offers separate hostels for boys and girls within the campus. Though on campusing placement rate is low and in the past some of the students were placed in some non exsisitng companies.

Events 
 Ecstasy 
Every year students organize ‘Ecstasy’, a creative event that helps students to polish their personality and skills.

Research 
The college has established the Sir J. C. Bose Creativity Center, where faculty members and researchers work under leadership of Professor (Dr) B. N. Biswas.

See also

References

External links 
 Official website

Information technology institutes
Colleges affiliated to West Bengal University of Technology
Engineering colleges in West Bengal
All India Council for Technical Education
2009 establishments in West Bengal
Educational institutions established in 2009